Saint-Daunès (Languedocien: Sent Daunès) is a former commune in the Lot department in south-western France. On 1 January 2019, it was merged into the new commune Barguelonne-en-Quercy.

Geography
The Barguelonnette flows southwestward through the commune and crosses the village.

See also
Communes of the Lot department

References

Saintdaunes
Populated places disestablished in 2019